Hwa Chong Institution Boarding School is a boarding school located in Hwa Chong Institution, Singapore. The boarding school is part of the Hwa Chong family of schools, including Hwa Chong Institution and Hwa Chong International School.

The boarding school began its operations in 2002, and was officially opened in 2003 by then deputy prime minister Lee Hsien Loong. There are also local Singaporean boarders, who are mainly students from Hwa Chong Institution.

Each 18-24 boarders will be assigned with a cluster mentor, who provides a link between boarding school and parents and who is concerned with all aspects of his/her education, personal development and welfare.

Boarding complex and facilities
Designed by architect Kenzo Tange, the complex consists of seven 6-storey blocks (Hall A - Hall G) providing accommodation for up to 1,000 boarders or guests. Halls A, B and C each has five residential levels (six for Hall E, F and G), in which each level is separated into left and right clusters, while Halls E, F and G each has six residential levels. Halls E, F, and G are also connected with walkways. Each cluster is supervised by a cluster mentor, who act as guardians to the students living there.

Integrated Boarding Programme
Besides scholars, all secondary 3 and 4 students of Hwa Chong Institution (High School) are given an opportunity to board in the boarding school for one term (at a time). Students may choose to continue boarding after their term has ended. As of 2014, it has been increased to 2 terms.

Boarders' Council 
The Boarders' Council is a student committee elected by the boarding school population. It acts as a bridge between boarders and the boarding school staff. The Boarders' Council is also responsible for the organization and planning of major events such as Investiture Dinner, National Day Celebrations, Year-End Dinner, Orientation and Chinese New Year. The first Boarders' Council was formed in 2001.

Reference

External links 
 Hwa Chong Institution Boarding School website
 http://www.hcibs.edu.sg/
 https://web.archive.org/web/20081226134112/http://council.hcibs.edu.sg/

2002 establishments in Singapore
Boarding schools in Singapore
Hwa Chong Institution
Educational institutions established in 2002